Long Crendon Courthouse is a 15th-century two-storeyed timber frame building located in Aylesbury, Buckinghamshire, England, and now a National Trust property and Grade II* listed building.

It is believed that the building was used as a wool store before serving to house manorial courts, which were held here from the reign of Henry V until the reign of Victoria.

The ground floor (which is now let out as a flat) was the village poor house.

References

External links

 Long Crendon Courthouse information at the National Trust

National Trust properties in Buckinghamshire
Historic house museums in Buckinghamshire
Grade II* listed buildings in Buckinghamshire